The Jufudu Dam (居甫渡大坝) is a gravity dam on the Lixian River, bordering the counties of Yuanjiang and Mojiang in Yunnan Province, China. The primary purpose of the dam is hydroelectric power generation and it supports a 285 MW power station. Construction began in September 2004, and the three 95 MW generators were commissioned in December 2008. It is the fifth dam in the Lixian cascade.

See also

List of dams and reservoirs in China
List of major power stations in Yunnan

External links

References

Dams in China
Hydroelectric power stations in Yunnan
Gravity dams
Dams completed in 2008
Dams on the Black River (Asia)
Roller-compacted concrete dams
Buildings and structures in Pu'er
Buildings and structures in Yuxi